Shatter or shattering may refer to:

 The act of violently breaking into small pieces
 Alan Shatter, Irish politician
 Susan Louise Shatter (1943–2011), American landscape painter
 Shattering (machine learning), a concept in mathematics, especially Vapnik–Chervonenkis theory
 Shatter attack, in computing, a technique used against Microsoft Windows operating systems
 Shattering (agriculture), an undesirable trait in crop plants that makes harvesting difficult
 Shatter (cannabis), a concentrate made from cannabis
 Brisance the shattering capability of a high explosive, determined mainly by its detonation pressure.

Entertainment
 Shatter (film), a 1974 film
 Shatter (comics), the Marvel Comics fictional mutant character
 Shatter (digital comic), the First Comics digital comic
 Shatter (novel), a 2008 novel by Australian author Michael Robotham
 Shatter (video game), a 2009 video game by Sidhe Interactive

Music
 Shatter (EP), a 2010 recording by Swiss black metal band Triptykon
 "Shatter" (song), by the British rock band Feeder
 "Shatter", a song from the album Blurring the Edges by Meredith Brooks

See also
 Fracture (disambiguation)
 Fragment (disambiguation)